The Torsten and Wanja Söderberg Prize is awarded annually to "an active Nordic designer or craftsman". The prize is administered by the Röhsska Museum and is worth 1 million SEK. The money comes from the foundation established by the brothers Torsten and Ragnar Söderberg, founders of the Swedish iron and steel wholesale company Söderberg and Haak.

Past winners
1994 Jane Reumert, Denmark
1995 Liv Blåvarp, Norway
1996 Brita Flander, Finland
1997 Mats Theselius, Sweden
1998 Louise Sass, Denmark
1999 Nordic design writers: Aðalsteinn Ingólfsson, Iceland; Kaj Kalin, Finland;John Vedel-Rieper, Denmark; Jorunn Veiteberg, Norway; and Kerstin Wickman, Sweden
2000 Peter Opsvik, Norway
2001 Björn Dahlström, Sweden
2002 HC Ericson, Sweden
2003 Sigurdur Gústafsson, Iceland
2004 Janna Syvänoja, Finland
2005 Anna Rosén, Cynthia Charwick, Maria Uggla, Maria Widell Christiansen, Camilla Palmertz, Eva-Lisa Andersson, Elna Holmberg, Lena Ekelund and Tatiana Butovitsch Temm, Sweden
2006 Ole Jensen, Denmark
2007 Norway Says; Torbjørn Anderssen, Andreas Engesvik and Espen Voll, Norway
2008 Steinunn Sigurðardóttir, Iceland
2009 Harri Koskinen, Finland
2010 Front: Sofia Lagerkvist, Charlotte von der Lancken and Anna Lindgren, Sweden
2011 Henrik Vibskov, Denmark
2012 Sigurd Bronger, Norway
 2013 Hjalti Karlsson, Iceland
 2014 Ann-Sofie Back, Sweden
 2015 Ilkka Suppanen, Finland
 2016 Margrethe Odgaard, Denmark
 2017 Daniel Rybakken, Norway
 2018 Brynjar Sigurðarson, Iceland

References

Design awards